2010 World Junior Championships may refer to:

 Athletics: 2010 World Junior Championships in Athletics
 Baseball: 2010 World Junior Baseball Championship
 Curling: 2010 World Junior Curling Championships
 Figure skating: 2010 World Junior Figure Skating Championships
 Ice hockey: 2010 World Junior Ice Hockey Championships
 Motorcycle speedway:
 2010 Individual Speedway Junior World Championship
 2010 Team Speedway Junior World Championship

See also
 2010 World Cup (disambiguation)
 2010 Continental Championships (disambiguation)
 2010 World Championships (disambiguation)